Hannah Kelsey Brown (born September 24, 1994) is an American television personality and former beauty pageant titleholder. She starred as the lead in season 15 of The Bachelorette. Brown had previously placed in the top seven in season 23 of The Bachelor. As a beauty pageant titleholder, Brown was crowned Miss Alabama USA 2018, and competed in Miss USA 2018. Following The Bachelorette, she competed on season 28 of Dancing with the Stars with partner, Alan Bersten, and was declared the winner on November 25, 2019.

Early life and education
Brown was born in Tuscaloosa, Alabama to parents Robert Walker Brown and Susanne Brown. She was raised both in Tuscaloosa and in nearby Northport, Alabama. She graduated from Tuscaloosa County High School, and later from the University of Alabama in 2017, receiving a degree magna cum laude from the university's College of Communication and Information Sciences. In college, she was a member of the Alpha Upsilon chapter of the Alpha Chi Omega sorority. Brown then worked as an interior designer in Northport.

Career

Pageantry
Brown began her pageantry career at age 15, competing in local Alabama teen pageants. As a teenager, she had placed first runner-up in Miss Alabama's Outstanding Teen 2010 and second runner-up in Miss Alabama Teen USA 2011. Brown later competed in Miss Alabama 2013, representing Tuscaloosa, however she did not place in the competition. After a brief hiatus from pageantry, Brown returned to compete in Miss Alabama USA 2017, but did not place in the competition. She returned the following year, representing West Alabama, and was crowned Miss Alabama USA 2018.

As Miss Alabama USA 2018, Brown was given the opportunity to represent Alabama at the Miss USA 2018 competition, held in Shreveport, Louisiana. While at Miss USA, Brown was roommates with future The Bachelor castmate Caelynn Miller-Keyes, who had been crowned Miss North Carolina USA 2018. For the pageant, Brown adopted a platform of mental health awareness, as she had previously suffered from anxiety and depression which caused her to leave pageantry for several years. Brown ultimately did not place in the competition and the pageant was won by Sarah Rose Summers of Nebraska. She resumed her reign after filming of The Bachelor had completed and crowned Hannah McMurphy as her successor in November 2018.

Reality television

The Bachelor

In 2018, Brown was cast in season 23 of The Bachelor, starring former professional football player Colton Underwood. Filming for the season took place throughout fall 2018, and Brown was later revealed by ABC to be a contestant on December 6, 2018. Brown went on to place seventh in the competition, being eliminated by Underwood during the episode airing February 18, 2019, and filmed in Denver, Colorado. During the second part of the season finale, aired on March 12, 2019, Brown was announced by host Chris Harrison as the lead for the upcoming fifteenth season of The Bachelorette. Brown is the first Bachelorette cast to not have placed in the top four of a season of The Bachelor.

The Bachelorette
In the season finale of The Bachelorette, Brown chose Jed Wyatt as her fiancé, although they later broke up after filming after it emerged through People that Wyatt had been in a relationship with another woman prior to and during his stint on the show. Brown later asked runner-up Tyler Cameron out on a date during the finale, although their relationship did not progress.

Dancing with the Stars
In August 2019, Brown was announced as one of the celebrities to compete on season 28 of Dancing with the Stars. Her appearance makes her the second woman in the show's history to participate from The Bachelorette, following Trista Sutter in the first season. She was partnered with professional dancer Alan Bersten during her tenure on the show. In the finale, which aired on November 25, Brown and Bersten were announced as the winners.

Dancing with the Stars (Season 28 Performances)

1 Score given by guest judge Leah Remini.

2 Score given by guest judge Joey Fatone.

People's Choice Award
On November 10, 2019, Brown won "The Competition Contestant of 2019" at the 45th People's Choice Awards for her time as lead on The Bachelorette.

Special Forces: World's Toughest Test
In 2023, Brown appeared on the reality TV series Special Forces: World's Toughest Test. She was one of two contestants to survive all 10 days and was also the last non-athlete standing.

Personal life
Brown began dating Adam Woolard in early 2021. The pair made their relationship official in February 2021 with a Valentine's Day tribute.

On May 16, 2020, Brown sang the lyrics of "Rockstar", a song by rapper DaBaby that included a racial slur, on Instagram Live. She was criticized by numerous media outlets, as well as other well-known cast members of The Bachelor, including former Bachelorette Rachel Lindsay. After initially denying that she used the slur, Brown issued a written apology on Instagram the next day promising "to do better". Two weeks later, she made another, much longer apology on Instagram that was well received.

Brown wrote an autobiographical book titled God Bless This Mess: Learning to Live and Love Through Life's Best (and Worst) Moments. She opens up about her struggles with depression, body image and more in the book, and details the joys and frustrations that have accompanied her newfound celebrity.

Filmography

Awards and nominations

References

External links

1994 births
American beauty pageant winners
Bachelor Nation contestants
Living people
Miss Alabama USA winners
Miss USA 2018 delegates
Dancing with the Stars (American TV series) winners
People from Northport, Alabama
People from Tuscaloosa, Alabama
University of Alabama alumni